Garu may refer to:

Places
 Akhurian River, also known as Garu, a river in the South Caucasus
 Garu, Ghana, town in northeastern Ghana
 Garu, Iran (disambiguation), various places in Iran
 Garu, Pakistan, village of NWFP, Pakistan

Fictional characters
 Garu, a character from Pucca series
 Garu, a character from Uchu Sentai Kyuranger